John Fitzpatrick was an Irish soccer player during the 1890s.

He played for the amateur Bohemians and the Ireland team during these times. He captained the Ireland team that played England in the 1895–96 British Home Championship. In doing so, he became Bohs' first ever international player. He also played a part in Bohemians' 6 Leinster Senior Cup final victories in a row during the 1890s.

Honours
Leinster Senior Cup
 Bohemians

References

Year of birth missing
Year of death missing
Bohemian F.C. players
Pre-1950 IFA international footballers
Irish association footballers (before 1923)

Association football defenders